The Kaydak Inlet or Sor Kaydak is a narrow inlet or arm at the eastern end of the Dead Kultuk (former Komsomolets), a bay of the Caspian Sea in the coast of Kazakhstan. Located at the mainland end of the bay, it forms the eastern limit of the Buzachi Peninsula, at the north of the Mangyshlak Peninsula. The inlet was shallow and cut deep into the coast extending east and then roughly southwards in a SSW direction. Like all shallow gulfs of the eastern shores of the Caspian, it had a high salinity.

In the same manner as the Dead Kultuk, the Kaydak Inlet had a distinct coastline in former times, but in the 1990s and 2000s, with higher Caspian Sea levels, the water penetrated inland through the neck of the bay producing waterlogged marshes. At times of higher water level both the bay and the inlet were filled with Caspian Sea water. The water in the shallow inlet had striking colours, in which delicate tones of blue or of brown predominated according to the seasons.

With shrinking Caspian Sea level in the 2020s as a result of global warming and increased evaporation, the Kaydak Inlet became dry.

Cartography
The area was mapped by Fedor Ivanovich Soimonov during the Caspian Expedition, which surveyed the Caspian Sea from 1719 to 1727, but was only accurately described later by G. S. Karelin in 1832.

See also
Dead Kultuk
Sor (geomorphology)

References

External links
Caspian Sea Biodiversity
Overview of oil and natural gas in the Caspian Sea region Last Updated: August 26, 2013

Bodies of water of Kazakhstan
Bays of the Caspian Sea
Inlets of Europe